Mangan is a town and the headquarter of the district of Mangan District in the Indian state of Sikkim. The town lying near River Teesta is connected to the capital Gangtok by a metalled road. Mangan District is the largest district of Sikkim in terms of area. The town lies in the geographic south of the district. After the opening up of the district, Mangan has witnessed a spurt in its economy, mostly due to organic farming. The town opens up the Tibetan Plateau. Mangan also serves the towns of Lachung, Chungthang and Lachen in the far north. Owing to its elevation, the town enjoys a temperate climate.

Geography 
It has an average elevation of 956 metres (3136 feet).

Demographics 

As of the 2011 Census of India, Mangan had a population of 4644. Males constitute 55% of the population and females 45%. Mangan has an average literacy rate of 83.81%, higher than state average of 81.42%: male literacy is 87.80%, and female literacy is 79.34% in Mangan.

Banking Facilities

The following Banks provide banking facilities in Mangan Town, Mangan district of Sikkim: 

Central Bank of India, Mangan
Canara Bank, Mangan
IDBI Bank, Mangan
State Bank Of India, Mangan
Union Bank of India, Mangan
Uco Bank, Mangan

References

External links 
 Travelling Indians

Cities and towns in Mangan district